Chengguan may refer to:
 Urban Administrative and Law Enforcement Bureau, commonly known in Chinese as Chengguan, local government law enforcement agency in the People's Republic of China
 Chengguan (monk) (738–839), Chinese monk, representative of the Huayan school of Chinese Buddhism

 Districts of China
 Chengguan District 
 Chengguan District, Lanzhou, Gansu
 Chengguan, the core district of Lhasa, Tibet

 Subdistricts of China
 Chengguan District 
 Chengguan Subdistrict, Beijing, in Fangshan District, Beijing
, in Sanyuan District, Sanming, Fujian
, subdivision of Jinta County, Gansu
, subdivision of Huixian, Henan
, subdivision of Beipiao, Liaoning
, subdivision of Lingyuan, Liaoning
, subdivision of Zhuanghe, Liaoning
, subdivision of Fufeng County, Shaanxi
, in Shangzhou District, Shangluo, Shaanxi
, in Yintai District, Tongchuan, Shaanxi
, subdivision of Dongming County, Shandong
, subdivision of Linqu County, Shandong
, in Weicheng District, Weifang, Shandong

See also 
Chengguan Town (disambiguation), for all towns named Chengguan
Chengguan Township (disambiguation), for all townships named Chengguan